"Parental Advisory" is a song by American hip hop recording artist Jay Rock, released as the first promotional single from his second studio album. The song, produced by SmokeyGotBeatz, heavily samples "Pump Pump" and "Tha Shiznit" by American rapper Snoop Dogg. Although the song was not released as an official single, it was released as a promotional recording to radio stations.

Music video
The music video was filmed in Watts, California. The music video features Jay Rock walking around his old neighborhood.

References

2014 songs
2014 singles
Top Dawg Entertainment singles
Jay Rock songs
Songs written by Jay Rock
Music videos directed by Dave Free